Les Wanyika is a prominent band with Tanzanian and Kenyan members based in Nairobi, Kenya. It was formed in 1978 when drummer Rashid Juma, guitarist Omar Shabani, bassist Tommy Malanga, saxophonist Sijali Salum Zuwa and Phoney Mkwanyule left the Simba Wanyika Band. They were joined by guitarist John Ngereza and vocalist Issa Juma. 

The Les Wanyika Band made many popular recordings, and are best remembered for their classic, ever fresh hit songs "Sina Makosa", "Jessica", "Barua Yako", "Paulina", "Afro", "Kwanza Jiulize", "Tafuta Wako", "Kajituliza Kasuku", "Nimaru", "Wazazi", "Mbaya Wako Rafiki Yako", "Pamela", "Shirika la Mapenzi", "Ufukara sio Kilema", "Amigo", "Safari ya Samburu", "Nisaidie Baba", "Ni Lipi la Ajabu", "Heshimuni Wazazi", "Esther Nikumbuke", "Sioni wala Sisikii", "Penzi Halina Siri", "Mke wa Kwanza", "Nimebaki Upweke", "Safari Sio Kifo", "Mzazi Wangu Mama", "Mama Watoto", "Dunia Kigeugeu", and "Usia wa Baba", among others. 

Vocalist Issa Juma later left the band to concentrate on other musical projects. Omar Shabani died in 1998 while John Ngereza died two years later.

Formation and history
In 1971, two brothers from the coastal region of Tanga Tanzania, Wilson and George Kinyonga formed a band they would later call Simba Wanyika, Swahili for Savannah Lions. Due to unsteady economic conditions in Tanzania in the 70s which strained the music industry, most of the artists of that time migrated to Kenya and other neighbouring countries in search of greener environments.

During that time, travelling between the two countries was made easy by the East African Community, a tripartite agreement of understanding among Kenya, Uganda and Tanzania. After the collapse of the community in 1977, border crossings were made difficult, hence the eventual establishment of permanent base in Kenya by the group. With its development and growth, the band created several offshoots, but most notable was Les Wanyika.  

Les Wanyika was formed in November 1978 by Rashid Juma, Omari Shabani, Tommy Malanga, Sijali Salum Zuwa and Phoney Mkwanyule. It was later joined by John Ngereza from Orch. Bwambe Bwambe, Issa Juma, Joseph Just, Mohammed Tika Abdallah and Victor Boniface.

With Les Wanyika, new members of the group included both Tanzanians and Kenyans. The famous John Ngereza, Issa Juma, Omar Shabani and Sijali Salum Zuwa were all from Tanzania, while Tommy Malanga and Rashid Juma are from Kenya. The band has a permanent base in Nairobi, playing in restaurants, clubs and various resorts.

Issa Juma later left the band and formed Super Wanyika. In 1988 Shabani left the group to join Everest Kings Band led by Abdul Muyonga, but eventually rejoined Les Wanyika. 

One of their hits was "Pamela", which was written by Shabani and dedicated to his wife Pamela Akinyi Omari. The song is to be distinguished from another song titled "Pamela" that was recorded by Simba Wanyika before Shabani left it to form Les Wanyika. This song too is dedicated to Pamela Akinyi.

In 2006 it was reported that the group would be reformed with a new line-up . 

The Band's current leaders are original founder members Sijali Salum Zuwa and Tommy Malanga.

See also
List of Wanyika bands, lists many of the offshoots of Les Wanyika and Simba Wanyika.

References

Kenyan musical groups
1978 establishments in Kenya
Soukous groups